Pamela Baily (born 29 October 1958) is an Australian tennis player.

Career 
Baily won the junior girl's title at the 1977 Australian Open in January (Amanda Tobin won the competition in December of that year).

References 

1958 births
Living people
Australian female tennis players
Australian Open (tennis) junior champions
Grand Slam (tennis) champions in girls' singles